Alessandro Tonti (born 28 May 1992) is an Italian professional footballer who plays as a goalkeeper for Italian  club Latina.

Career
Born in Cattolica, Tonti started his career in Grosseto youth sector.

In 2011, he moved to Cesena U-19. He was loaned to Borgo a Buggiano for 2012–13 Serie C2 season. Tonti made his professional on 2 September against Aversa Normanna.

He left Cesena in 2014, and signed with Serie C club Teramo. He extended his contract the next season.

In the 2016–17 season, he played with Latina.

On 15 August 2017, he joined to Serie C club Matera.

On 19 August 2020, he moved to Ravenna.

On 7 January 2022, he returned to Latina as a free agent.

References

External links
 
 

1992 births
Living people
Sportspeople from the Province of Rimini
Footballers from Emilia-Romagna
Italian footballers
Association football goalkeepers
Serie C players
Lega Pro Seconda Divisione players
Serie D players
U.S. Grosseto 1912 players
A.C. Cesena players
Forlì F.C. players
S.S. Teramo Calcio players
Latina Calcio 1932 players
Mantova 1911 players
F.C. Matera players
Como 1907 players
U.S. Avellino 1912 players
Ravenna F.C. players